Suryanarayan, Suryanarayana or Surya Narayana is the name of Hindu Sun God Surya. It is also a common Indian name.

 Bayya Suryanarayana Murthy, Parliamentarian and leader of the Dalit movement
 Kommareddi Suryanarayana, Indian Parliamentarian.
 Lingam Suryanarayana, Surgeon from Andhra Pradesh, India. 
 Missula Suryanarayana Murti Indian politician and Member of Parliament. 
 Ravula Suryanarayana Murty Indian poet and writer.
 Vyricherla Kishore Chandra Suryanarayana Deo Indian politician and a member of the Indian National Congress.
 Yadavalli Suryanarayana Theater and cinema actor.
 Suryanarayana (Bajrang Dal), Hindu activist and leader of the Bajrang Dal.
 Suryanarayana Temple, Arasavalli, a temple dedicated to suryanarayana (sun god) in Arasavalli, Srikakulam District, Andhra Pradesh, India

Indian surnames
Indian given names